Chassigny is a Martian meteorite which fell on October 3, 1815, at approximately 8:00 am, in Chassigny, north-eastern France. Chassigny is the meteorite for which the chassignites are named, and gives rise to the "C" in the name of the SNC group of meteorites. Chassigny is an olivine cumulate rock (dunite). It consists almost entirely of olivine with intercumulus pyroxene, feldspar, and oxides. It was the only known chassignite until NWA2737 was found in the Moroccan Sahara in northwest Africa.

Chassigny is particularly important because, unlike most SNCs, its noble gas composition differs from that in the current Martian atmosphere. These differences are presumably due to its cumulate (mantle-derived) nature.

See also 
 Glossary of meteoritics
 Meteorite falls

References 

Martian meteorites
1815 in France
Haute-Marne
1815 in science
Meteorites found in France
October 1815 events